Michelle Rogers may refer to:

Michelle Rogers (judoka) (born 1976), British judoka
Michelle Rodgers, America's Junior Miss 2009
Michele Rogers, American model and actress